This article lists the confirmed squads for the 2014 Women's Hockey World Cup tournament to be held in The Hague, Netherlands between 31 May and 15 June 2014.

Players' Age as of 30 May 2014.

Pool A

Australia
On 30 April 2014 Commens named his final squad.

Head coach: Adam Commens

Belgium
Belgian squad was announced on 21 May 2014.

Head coach: Pascal Kina

Japan
Head coach: Yoo Seung-jin

Netherlands
On 8 May 2014 Caldas announced his squad.

Head coach: Maximiliano Caldas

New Zealand
New Zealand squad was named by head coach Mark Hager on 20 May.

Head coach: Mark Hager

South Korea
Head coach: Han Jin-soo

Pool B

Argentina
The squad was announced on 16 April 2014.

Head coach: Carlos Retegui

China
Head coach: You Baodong

England
England squad was named on 8 May.

Head coach: Jason Lee

Germany
The squad was announced on 17 April 2014.

Head coach: Jamilon Mülders

South Africa
Bonnet named his squad on 6 May.

Head coach: Giles Bonnet

United States
On 19 May head coach Parnham announced his final squad selection.

Head coach: Craig Parnham

References

External links
Official website
Team rosters

squads
Women's Hockey World Cup squads